The factored language model (FLM) is an extension of a conventional language model introduced by Jeff Bilmes and Katrin Kirchoff in 2003.  In an FLM, each word is viewed as a vector of k factors:   An FLM provides the probabilistic model  where the prediction of a factor  is based on  parents .  For example, if  represents a word token and  represents a Part of speech tag for English, the expression  gives a model for predicting current word token based on a traditional Ngram model as well as the Part of speech tag of the previous word.

A major advantage of factored language models is that they allow users to specify linguistic knowledge such as the relationship between word tokens and Part of speech in English, or morphological information (stems, root, etc.) in Arabic.

Like N-gram models, smoothing techniques are necessary in parameter estimation.  In particular, generalized back-off is used in training an FLM.

References

Language modeling
Statistical natural language processing
Probabilistic models